is a 2005 action role-playing game developed by Nihon Falcom. It is a remake of the third game in the Ys series, Ys III: Wanderers from Ys. It was first released for Windows in Japan in June 2005, with an English localization by Xseed Games in March 2012. A PlayStation Portable version was also released in Japan in April 2010 and later in North America and Europe. A high-definition remaster for the Nintendo Switch is scheduled for release in Japan in May 2023.

Synopsis
As in Ys III, Adol Christin and his friend Dogi are traveling to Dogi's hometown of Felghana three years after the events of the first two games. Upon arriving, they discover that evil happenings are threatening the townspeople, and it is up to Adol to put a stop to it. The basic plot was slightly modified from the original and expanded through the use of additional scenes.

The game-play follows the new model from Ys VI: The Ark of Napishtim, with several improvements. Many things from the previous game were streamlined to keep the focus on the action as opposed to equipment and item management. For example, healing item and stat bonuses are no longer carried as items or accessories; instead, these bonuses are dropped from defeated enemies and are used upon pickup along with an experience bonus for attack combos. These bonuses are maintained through constant combat.

Development and release
The Oath in Felghana was first released in Japan for Windows on June 30, 2005. It later received a port for the PlayStation Portable in Japan on April 22, 2010, with an English release by Xseed Games on November 2. In order to help offset localization costs, XSEED licensed and paid for the use of a fan translation that had been produced previously for the PC version. Xseed later added the localization to the Windows version, releasing it on March 19, 2012. This version is the same as the original Japanese PC release, but added achievements and leaderboards. The English voice acting was later added to the Windows version via a free update in February 2020, along with the ability to change the soundtrack to the PC-88 or X68000 version. A remaster, Ys Memoire: The Oath in Felghana, is scheduled for release in Japan for the Nintendo Switch on April 27, 2023. It will feature voiced dialogue for Adol, higher-quality textures and character illustrations, and the optional ability to use the soundtracks from the PC-8801 and X68000 versions of Wanderers from Ys.

The soundtrack from Ys III: Wanderers from Ys was re-arranged for this game by Yukihiro Jindo. The full 2-CD soundtrack, Ys -The Oath in Felghana- Original Sound Track, was released in 2005. Released at the same time was Ys -The Oath in Felghana- Super Arrange Version, a disc with 10 additional Oath in Felghana arrangements. The Original Sound Track and Super Arrange Version were also released together in a package known as the Ys -The Oath in Felghana- Perfect Collection. Ys: The Oath in Felghana Musical Selections is a collection of 23 songs from the game that Xseed Games released with the Premium Edition of the North American release of the PSP port of the game.

Reception

Ys: The Oath in Felghana for PSP received "generally favorable" reviews, according to review aggregator Metacritic, garnering a score of 80/100 based on 25 critic reviews.

References

External links

2005 video games
Action role-playing video games
Nihon Falcom games
Nintendo Switch games
PlayStation Portable games
Single-player video games
Video game remakes
Video games developed in Japan
Windows games
Ys (series)
Xseed Games games